In Eskaleut languages, the dubitative mood (abbreviated ) is a verb form used for dependent adverbial clauses with the meaning 'whether'. The following example is from North Alaskan Inupiaq:

Due to the broader meaning of the term mood in the context of Eskimo grammar, the dubitative can be considered outside of the proper scope of grammatical mood. Also, its meaning is not related to that of the dubitative moods of non-Eskimo languages.

References

Bibliography
 

Eskaleut languages
Grammatical moods
Inupiat language